Jean-Pierre Isaac  (born 5 January 1956) in Belgium, emigrated to Quebec in 1961.
Jean-Pierre Isaac is a bilingual lyricist, composer, programmer, DJ, recording studio owner (located in Montreal's Le Plateau-Mont-Royal borough) and a music producer.
His contributions to music and his national and international success have earned him many awards.

Expertises
Jean-Pierre Isaac main expertises are: Composing, Arranging, Programming, Recording, Producing & Mastering.
His main instruments are Computers, Guitars, Bass, Keyboards, Drums & Percussions, and also performs as a Lead & Backup Singer, for studio sessions.

Profile
Jean-Pierre Isaac has written and/or produced music for many artists, notably the French Gilbert Montagné, Quebec's Mitsou, Les BB, Celine Dion, Cindy Daniel, Marie Carmen, Mario Pelchat, Judith Berard, Scripture (his solo project featured on "Cafe del Mar", and released album No Word Needed), and many more. He is also the composer and producer of many TV-themes and radio-TV commercial spots.

Awards
 7 platinum, double platinum and triple platinum albums.
 9 gold albums.
 6 Félix awards.
 2 3M Visionary awards.
 2 Socan awards.
 1 Talcan award.

References

External links 
 Jean-Pierre Isaac's Official website

1956 births
Living people
Belgian emigrants to Canada
Songwriters from Quebec
Musicians from Quebec